Tell The World My Name is the debut album of the American emcee K-Solo.

Hits like "Your Mom's in My Business" and "Spellbound" proved the growing success of his style.

The song "Spellbound" was later sampled by R&B group Brownstone for their 1994 hit "If You Love Me".

On June 21, 2009, Traffic Entertainment Group reissued Tell The World My Name with five bonus tracks that were remix and a cappella versions of the singles released from the album.

Track listing 
All tracks produced by Parrish Smith, except track 1, which is produced by Erick Sermon.
 "Spellbound"
 "Rockin' for My Hometown"
 "Everybody Knows Me"
 "Speed Blocks"
 "Fugitive"
 "Tales from the Crack Side"
 "Your Mom's in My Business"
 "Real Solo Please Stand Up"
 "Renee-Renee"
 "Solo Rocks the House"
 "The Messenger"
 "Drums of Death"

References 

1990 debut albums
K-Solo albums
Atlantic Records albums
Albums produced by Erick Sermon